The Redmires Reservoirs are a group of three reservoirs in Fulwood, Sheffield, South Yorkshire, England. They are fed from the Hallam Moors by various small streams including Fairthorn Clough. The three reservoirs are named Upper, Middle and Lower and were built between 1833 and 1854 to provide clean drinking water via an open water course which led to the Hadfield Dam situated in Crookes, following the devastating Sheffield cholera epidemic of 1832. The dams were built as part of the Sheffield Water Works continuing expansion to meet the ever growing population of Sheffield.

The area is popular with walkers and bird watchers. Adjacent to the Middle Reservoir is Hammond's Field Nature Reserve, which is managed by The Wildlife Trust for Sheffield and Rotherham. The nature reserve forms part of the South Pennine Moors Special Protected Area. A path, the Long Causeway leads from the Upper reservoir, onto the moors to Stanedge Pole and then onto Stanage Edge. This route was once thought to be a Roman road but is now thought to be a Medieval packhorse saltway, used to convey salt from Cheshire to Yorkshire.

References

External links 
 Yorkshire Water – Redmires reservoir

Geography of Sheffield
Reservoirs of the Peak District
Reservoirs in South Yorkshire